The Vercingetorix Monument (1865) is a statuary monument dedicated to the Gaulish chieftain Vercingetorix, defeated by Julius Caesar in the Gallic Wars. It is designated as a monument historique.

The monument was commissioned by Emperor Napoleon III from the sculptor Aimé Millet and installed in 1865 on Mont Auxois, near Alise-Sainte-Reine in the Côte-d'Or department in the Burgundy region of eastern France. The site was the supposed site of Alesia. The architect for the memorial was Eugène Viollet-le-Duc.  The base has an nationalistic inscription installed by Viollet-le-Duc, translating into French the words of Julius Caesar:

La Gaule unie
Formant une seule nation
Animée d'un même esprit,
Peut défier l'Univers.

(Gaul united,
Forming a single nation
Animated by a common spirit,
Can defy the Universe.)

References

See also
 Hermannsdenkmal (Germany)

Buildings and structures completed in 1865
Landmarks in France
Monuments and memorials in France
Buildings and structures in Côte-d'Or
Cultural depictions of Vercingetorix
Statues of military officers
Statues of monarchs
19th-century architecture in France